The McLaren M840T engine is a , 90-degree, twin-turbocharged, flat-plane V8 petrol engine, designed and developed and produced by McLaren, in partnership and collaboration with Ricardo, and introduced with their 720S sports car model, in 2017. It is an evolution of the M838T engine, introduced in 2011.

Development
McLaren bought the rights to the Tom Walkinshaw Racing developed engine, itself based on the Nissan VRH engine architecture, which was designed for the IRL Indycar championship but never raced. However, other than the  bore and  stroke, little of that engine remains in the M840T.

Developed with help from Ricardo, the engine redlines at 8500 rpm, but 80% of the engine's torque is available as low as 2000 rpm. McLaren claims that the engine has the highest horsepower to  emission ratio of any current production engine.

M840T engine uses double MHI (Mitsubishi Heavy Industries) turbochargers which names TD05H-06*20HF1T-12T. Despite the name, these are not the same turbochargers which used in the Mitsubishi Lancer Evo IX (X).

The engine is built at Ricardo's engine assembly facility in Shoreham-by-Sea, West Sussex.

Applications
McLaren's new M840T engine debuted as an evolution of the M838T used in the 650S. It is a  twin-turbocharged V8 engine. However, the stroke has been lengthened by 3.6 mm to increase the capacity and 41% of the engine's components are new. The engine uses new twin-scroll turbochargers which have a low inertia titanium-aluminium turbines which spin with maximum efficiency with the help of actively controlled waste gates.

References

External links
Official McLaren Automotive website

Engines by model
Gasoline engines by model
McLaren Group
V8 engines